Black is an unincorporated community in Mercer and Wyoming counties, West Virginia, United States.

References

Unincorporated communities in Mercer County, West Virginia
Unincorporated communities in Wyoming County, West Virginia
Unincorporated communities in West Virginia